The Sa Huỳnh culture was a culture in modern-day central and southern Vietnam that flourished between 1000 BC and 200 AD. Archaeological sites from the culture have been discovered from the Mekong Delta to Quảng Bình province in central Vietnam. The Sa Huynh people were most likely the predecessors of the Cham people, an Austronesian-speaking people and the founders of the kingdom of Champa.

Description
The site at Sa Huỳnh was discovered in 1909. Sa Huỳnh sites were rich in locally worked iron artefacts, typified by axes, swords, spearheads, knives and sickles. In contrast, bronze artifacts were dominant in the Đông Sơn culture sites found in northern Vietnam and elsewhere in mainland Southeast Asia.

The Sa Huỳnh culture cremated adults and buried them in jars covered with lids, a practice unique to the culture. Ritually broken offerings usually accompanied the jar burials. The culture is also typified by its unique ear ornaments featuring two-headed animals, believed by some to depict saola. The ornaments were commonly made from jade (nephrite), but also made from glass. Bead ornaments were also commonly found in Sa Huynh burials, most commonly made from glass.

Trade network
The Sa Huỳnh culture showed evidence of an extensive trade network that existed between 500 BC to AD 1500, known as the Sa Huynh-Kalanay Interaction Sphere (named after the Sa Huỳnh culture and the Kalanay Cave of Masbate, Philippines). It was mainly between Sa Huỳnh and the Philippines, but also extended into archaeological sites in Taiwan, Southern Thailand, and northeastern Borneo. It is characterized by shared red-slipped pottery traditions, as well as double-headed and penannular ornaments known as lingling-o made from materials like green jade (sourced from Taiwan), green mica (from Mindoro), black nephrite (from Hà Tĩnh) and clay (from Vietnam and the Northern Philippines). Sa Huynh also produced beads made from glass, carnelian, agate, olivine, zircon, gold and garnet; most of whom use materials that are also imported. Han dynasty-style bronze mirrors were also found in Sa Huynh sites.

Timeline of Iron age

Dates are approximate, consult particular article for details
 Prehistoric (or Proto-historic) Iron Age  Historic Iron Age

Artifacts

See also
 Austronesian peoples
 Plain of Jars
 Cát Tiên sanctuary
 Óc Eo
 Champa
 Buni culture
 Tabon Caves

Notes

References

 Higham, Charles, The Bronze Age of Southeast Asia, 
 Higham, Charles, Early Cultures of Mainland Southeast Asia, 

Ancient Vietnam
Archaeological cultures of Southeast Asia
Archaeological cultures in Vietnam
Iron Age cultures of Asia
1st millennium BC in Vietnam
Archaeology of the Philippines